Offiong Edem (born 31 December 1986 in Calabar) is a Nigerian table tennis player. She competed for Nigeria at the 2004 and 2012, and 2016 Summer Olympics.

She qualified to represent Nigeria at the 2020 Summer Olympics.

References

1986 births
Living people
People from Calabar
Nigerian female table tennis players
Olympic table tennis players of Nigeria
Table tennis players at the 2004 Summer Olympics
Table tennis players at the 2012 Summer Olympics
Table tennis players at the 2016 Summer Olympics
Table tennis players at the 2014 Commonwealth Games
African Games medalists in table tennis
African Games gold medalists for Nigeria
African Games silver medalists for Nigeria
African Games bronze medalists for Nigeria
Competitors at the 2007 All-Africa Games
Competitors at the 2011 All-Africa Games
Competitors at the 2015 African Games
Competitors at the 2019 African Games
Commonwealth Games competitors for Nigeria
Table tennis players at the 2020 Summer Olympics
20th-century Nigerian women
21st-century Nigerian women